A Son of Man is a 2018 Ecuadorian adventure film directed by Jamaicanoproblem and co- directed by Pablo Agüero. It was selected as the Ecuadorian entry for the Best Foreign Language Film at the 91st Academy Awards, but it was not nominated.

Plot
A circumspect American teenager from Minneapolis joins his mysterious father in Ecuador, where they embark on a treasure hunt for Incan gold.

Cast
 Luis Felipe Fernández-Salvador y Boloña
 Luis Felipe Fernández-Salvador y Campodonico
 Lily Aimée Juliette van Ghemen 
 Fernando Cunuhay Yanchapaxi
 Andrés Fernández-Salvador y Zaldumbide
 Byron Chacaguasay
 Ramón Cobeña Alava
 Wilson Edmundo Viteri Pozo 
 Manri Ovidio Rodriguez 
 Olmedo Toscano

See also
 List of submissions to the 91st Academy Awards for Best Foreign Language Film
 List of Ecuadorian submissions for the Academy Award for Best Foreign Language Film

References

External links
 
Official A Son of Man Website

2018 films
2018 drama films
Ecuadorian drama films
2010s Spanish-language films
Quechua-language films